The 2016–17 Quinnipiac Bobcats women's basketball team represented Quinnipiac University  during the 2016–17 NCAA Division I women's basketball season. The Bobcats were led by twenty-second year head coach, Tricia Fabbri. They played their home games in TD Bank Sports Center and were members of the Metro Atlantic Athletic Conference. They finished the season 29–7, 17–3 in MAAC play to win MAAC regular season and tournament titles to earn an automatic trip to the NCAA women's tournament.. They upset Marquette and Miami (FL) in the first and second rounds before falling to eventual champions South Carolina in the sweet sixteen.

Roster

Schedule

|-
!colspan=9 style="background:#003664; color:#C2980B;"| Regular season

|-
!colspan=9 style="background:#003664; color:#C2980B;"| MAAC Women's Tournament

|-
!colspan=9 style="background:#003664; color:#C2980B;"| NCAA Women's Tournament

See also
 2016–17 Quinnipiac Bobcats men's basketball team

References

Quinnipiac Bobcats women's basketball seasons
Quinnipiac
Quinnipiac